The 1978 WTA Christchurch (sponsored as the Colgate International) was a tennis tournament organised for female professional tennis players. It was the 3rd edition of the WTA Christchurch tournament, and the 1st since 1972, as it was cancelled during 1972–77, and this was the first time the event was a professional tournament and offered prize money and ranking points, upgraded from the non-tour event in the first two editions.

Although held from 20–26 November 1978, it was part of the 1979 women's tennis season.

Regina Maršíková of Czechoslovakia won the singles, and Australian–American duo Lesley Hunt and Sharon Walsh won the doubles.

Results

Singles

Section 1

Section 2

Section 3

Section 4

Doubles

References

External links
 Results at the International Tennis Federation

WTA Christchurch
Christchurch